Miras International School may refer to either of two schools in Kazakhstan:
 Miras International School, Almaty
 Miras International School, Astana